Good as Gold is a 1927 American silent Western film directed by Scott R. Dunlap and written by Jack Jungmeyer. The film stars Buck Jones, Frances Lee, Carl Miller, Charles K. French, Adele Watson and Arthur Ludwig. The film was released on June 12, 1927, by Fox Film Corporation.

Cast   
 Buck Jones as Buck Brady
 Frances Lee as Jane Laurier
 Carl Miller as Thomas Tilford
 Charles K. French as Sheriff John Gray 
 Adele Watson as Timothea
 Arthur Ludwig as Henchman
 Mickey Moore as Buck Brady as a child

References

External links
 

1927 films
1927 Western (genre) films
Fox Film films
Films directed by Scott R. Dunlap
American black-and-white films
Silent American Western (genre) films
1920s English-language films
1920s American films